CIA involvement was alleged in the Whitlam dismissal in Australia in 1975. The Australian Prime Minister Gough Whitlam and his government were removed by the Governor-General Sir John Kerr as a culmination of the 1975 Australian constitutional crisis. Whitlam and his supporters maintained that the CIA encouraged or was otherwise involved in the Dismissal because it saw Whitlam as a threat to the US intelligence relationship with Australia.

Background
There were a number of points of tension between Whitlam's government and the United States intelligence apparatus. Whitlam had close ties with the United States, in 1964 receiving a "Leader" travel grant from the U.S. Department of State to spend three months studying under U.S. government and military officials.

After coming to power, Whitlam quickly removed the last Australian troops from Vietnam. Whitlam government ministers criticised the US bombing of North Vietnam at the end of 1972. The US complained diplomatically about the criticism.  In March 1973, US secretary of State William Rogers told Richard Nixon that "the leftists [within the Labor Party would] try to throw overboard all military alliances and eject our highly classified US defence space installations from Australia".

In 1973, Whitlam ordered the Australian security organisation ASIS to close its operation in Chile, where it was working as a proxy for the CIA in opposition to Chile's president Salvador Allende. 

Whitlam's Attorney-General Lionel Murphy used the Australian Federal Police to conduct a raid on the headquarters of the Australian Security Intelligence Organisation (ASIO) in March 1973. CIA Chief of Counter-Intelligence, James Angleton, later said Murphy had "barged in and tried to destroy the delicate mechanism of internal security". Australian journalist Brian Toohey said that Angleton considered then Australian Prime Minister Gough Whitlam a "serious threat" to the US and was concerned after the 1973 raid on ASIO headquarters. In 1974, Angleton sought to instigate the removal of Whitlam from office by having CIA station chief in Canberra, John Walker, ask the director general of ASIO, Peter Barbour, to make a false declaration that Whitlam had lied about the raid in Parliament. Barbour refused to make the statement.

In 1974, Whitlam ordered the head of ASIO, Peter Barbour, to sever all ties with the CIA. Barbour ignored Whitlam's order and contact between Australian and US security agencies was driven underground. Whitlam later established a royal commission into intelligence and security. 

Jim Cairns became Deputy Prime Minister after the 1974 election. He was viewed by US secretary of state Henry Kissinger and defence secretary James Schlesinger as "a radical with strong anti-American and pro-Chinese sympathies". The US administration was concerned that he would have access to classified United States intelligence. 

Whitlam instantly dismissed ASIS chief WT Robinson in 1975 after discovering ASIS had assisted the Timorese Democratic Union in an attempted coup against the Portuguese administration in Timor, without informing Whitlam's government. 

Whitlam threatened to reveal the identities of CIA agents working in Australia. He also threatened not to renew the lease of the US spy base at Pine Gap, which was due to expire on 10 December 1975. The US was also concerned about Whitlam's intentions towards its spy base at Nurrungar.

Allegations of CIA involvement
Prior to the Dismissal, Kerr requested and received a briefing from senior defence officials on a CIA threat to end intelligence co-operation with Australia. During the crisis, Whitlam alleged that Country Party leader Doug Anthony had close links to the CIA. Later it was alleged that Kerr had acted for the United States government in dismissing Whitlam. The most common allegation is that the CIA influenced Kerr's decision. In 1966 Kerr had joined the Congress for Cultural Freedom, a conservative group that had secretly received CIA funding. Christopher Boyce, who was convicted of spying for the Soviet Union, said that the CIA wanted Whitlam removed because he threatened to close US military bases in Australia, including the CIA's own Pine Gap spy station near Alice Springs. Boyce was a 22-year-old employee of a US defence industry contractor at the time of the Dismissal. He claimed that Kerr was described by the CIA as "our man Kerr". Victor Marchetti, a CIA officer turned US critic who had helped run the Pine Gap facility, said that the threatened close of US bases in Australia "caused apoplexy in the White House, [and] a kind of Chile [coup] was set in motion", with the CIA and MI6 working together to get rid of the Prime Minister. Jonathan Kwitny wrote in his book The Crimes of Patriots that the CIA "paid for Kerr's travel, built his prestige ... Kerr continued to go to the CIA for money". In 1974, the White House sent as ambassador to Australia Marshall Green, who was known as "the coupmaster" for his central role in the 1965 coup against Indonesian President Sukarno.

Subsequent evaluation

In 1977, United States Deputy Secretary of State Warren Christopher made a special trip to Sydney to meet with Whitlam and told him, on behalf of US President Jimmy Carter, of his willingness to work with whatever government Australians elected, and that the US would never again interfere with Australia's democratic processes. The use of the word "again" has been interpreted by some as evidence that the US encouraged, or actively intervened, in Whitlam's dismissal. Richard Butler, who was present at the meeting as Whitlam’s principal private secretary, believed at the time, and remained convinced, that Christopher's wording was an admission that the US had intervened in Whitlam's dismissal.

Kerr denied being involved in the CIA and there is no evidence for it in his private writings. Confidential correspondence between Kerr and the Queen's Private Secretary, Sir Martin Charteris, released in July 2020 indicates that Kerr said that his alleged involvement with the CIA was "nonsense" and that he consistently reaffirmed his "continued loyalty" to the Crown. Whitlam himself later wrote that Kerr, "fascinated as he had long been with intelligence matters", did not need any encouragement from the CIA.

Edward Woodward, who was ASIO chief from 1976 and 1981, dismissed the notion of CIA involvement. 

Justice Robert Hope, who had twice been royal commissioner investigating the Australian intelligence agencies, said in 1998 that he had attempted to locate and interview a witness who had allegedly given in-camera evidence to the Church Committee about CIA involvement in the Dismissal, but had been unable to find either the witness or testimony. 

In 2015, Australian diplomatic and military historian Peter Edwards dismissed the claim that Kerr’s action was instigated by US and UK intelligence agencies, which he called an "enduring conspiracy theory".

See also
United States involvement in regime change

References

Works cited
 

1975 Australian constitutional crisis
Constitutional crisis
Australian constitutional crisis
History of the Australian Labor Party
Gough Whitlam
Malcolm Fraser
1975 in Australian law
October 1975 events in Australia
November 1975 events in Australia
Central Intelligence Agency